LCCM may refer to:

La Consolacion College Manila
London College of Creative Media, formerly London Centre of Contemporary Music
Theory of Lexical Concepts and Cognitive Models, in the LCCM Theory of Vyvyan Evans